The Motive (original title: El autor, "The author") is a 2017 Spanish drama film directed by Manuel Martín Cuenca. The film premiered at the 2017 Toronto International Film Festival.

Plot
Álvaro separates from his wife Amanda, an elated best-seller writer, and motivated by her success, makes up his mind to write a great novel. Problem is, he lacks talent and imagination. He figures out that great fiction is drawn from reality, and he begins to manipulate his neighbors and to get involved in their lives in order to find inspiration for his writing.

Cast
Javier Gutiérrez as Álvaro
María León as Amanda
Adelfa Calvo as Portera (caretaker)
Adriana Paz as Irene
Tenoch Huerta as Enrique
Rafael Téllez as Sr. Montero
Antonio de la Torre as Juan
Domi del Postigo as Presentador (presenter)
José Carlos Carmona as Jesús
Alberto González as Don Alfonso

Reception

Critical reception
On review aggregator website Rotten Tomatoes, the film holds an approval rating of 63%, based on 19 reviews, and an average rating of 6.94/10.

Awards

Premios Goya

Curiosity 
Some of the "penguins scene" from Werner Herzog's Encounters at the End of the World is featured in the first scene.

References

External links
 

2017 films
2017 drama films
Spanish drama films
Films about writers
Spanish-language Netflix original films
2010s Spanish-language films
2010s Spanish films
Mexican drama films
2010s Mexican films